Amtali may refer to:

Bangladesh 
 Amtali Upazila, an upazila of Barisal District
 Amtali, Barisal, a town in Barisal Division

India
Amtali, Agartala, India